Henry Gordon Strong (June 3, 1869 – February 24, 1954) was a Chicago businessman and founder of Gordon Strong and Company in 1927 which still operates today.

Life

He was born in Burlington, Iowa to Henry Strong (1829-1911) and Mary Jane Halstead (1831-1904.  He was married first to Roberta Margaret Hubbard (1876-1935) May 15, 1901 and second to Louise Ann Snyder (1875-1949) on October 8, 1914, both weddings taking place in Chicago.  His father was a well known Chicago attorney and president of the Atchison, Topeka and Santa Fe Railway.  His father served as a Colonel in the U. S. Army in the 124th Field Artillery in WWI and as a Lt. Colonel in the 108th Engineers in the Spanish American War.  He and his second wife are buried in the Strong Mausoleum at Sugarloaf Mountain.

Legacy

Gordon Strong, the name which he used for most of his life, made several real estate acquisitions centered around his Strong Mansion at Sugarloaf Mountain in Montgomery County, Maryland a monadnock mountain with views of the Potomac River and Monocacy valleys. The property was deeded to Stronghold, Inc., a non-profit land trust created in 1946 which still owns and continues to maintain the property for public access.

In 1925, he engaged Frank Lloyd Wright to develop plans for what became known as the Gordon Strong Automobile Objective  This project was never started and the land remains in a more rustic and natural state.

References

External links
"Frank Lloyd Wright: Designs for an American Landscape, 1922-1932 Gordon Strong Automobile Objective".  Library of Congress.
"Henry Gordon Strong Mausoleum". FindAGrave.
"Stronghold, Inc.". Sugarloaf Stronghold, Inc. Website.
"Chicago Tribune Obituary". Chicago Tribune, Chicago, Illinois, 25 Feb 1954, Thu  •  Page 32

1869 births
1954 deaths
Spanish–American War
People of World War I
Environmental conservation